This is a list of members of the Romanian Academy.

References
  Academia Română: Membrii Academiei Române din 1866 până în prezent

External links

Members of the Romanian Academy
Academicians
Romania